Barbara Weeks (born Susan Kingsley; July 4, 1913 – June 24, 2003) was an American film actress who performed primarily in Hollywood productions of the 1930s.

Early years
Weeks was born in Somerville, Massachusetts, and attended Melrose High School. Her mother was an actress, and "from the time Barbara was 3 years old her ambition was to be an actress, too." She entered acting through her participation in the Ziegfeld Follies, when she was cast in Whoopee. "I was scared to death," Weeks said of meeting Florenz Ziegfeld. "His office was an oblong room and you had to walk and walk to get to his desk. He was seated behind his desk, where on top were an assortment of toy elephants. I'll never forget that meeting." After the show closed, Weeks and other cast members, including star Eddie Cantor and Ethel Shutta, were brought to Hollywood to make the film version. Weeks felt it did not translate well, in spite of its smash hit success. "The audience has a lot to do with it. When you are on the stage, every audience is different. Filming is very tiresome and boring, and it doesn't give you the enthusiasm you get from the stage. That was evident in Whoopee! the film."

Film
In 1931, Weeks was named as one of 14 girls selected as a "WAMPAS Baby Star",  which launched her into a brief but successful acting career, mostly in cliffhanger serials and B-movie films and B-Westerns. She claimed placement in westerns was punishment by Columbia head Harry Cohn for refusing his advances. "Cohn, however, never realized how much I liked being in them," she said. "He considered westerns punishment, but naturally I never mentioned it to him. I just enjoyed myself." He loaned her out to low budget studios to humiliate her as well, but it backfired. One of the films she was most proud of was Woman Unafraid, made by Goldsmith.

On August 23, 1938, Weeks appeared in a television experiment at NBC, an adaptation of Edwin Burke's play Good Medicine, co-starring Pat Lawrence and Lily Cahill. NBC telecasts were officially secret at the time, with audiences limited to 500–1000 viewers on company-owned sets.

Later years
Following Parker's death, Weeks moved to New York City and began working as a model. 

Weeks had "a brief marriage to the actor Guinn 'Big Boy' Williams."

Partial filmography

 Whoopee! (1930) - Goldwyn Girl (uncredited)
 Man to Man (1930) - Alice (uncredited)
 Illicit (1931) - Girl at the Bridal Shower (uncredited)
 50 Million Frenchmen (1931) - Dowager's Daughter (uncredited)
 Party Husband (1931) - Sally (uncredited)
 Men of the Sky (1931) - (uncredited)
 Palmy Days (1931) - Joan Clark
 Two Fisted Justice (1931) - Nancy Cameron
 Men in Her Life (1931) - Miss Mulholland
 The Guilty Generation (1931) - Party Girl (uncredited)
 Discarded Lovers (1932) - Valerie Christine
 Stepping Sisters (1932) - Norma Ramsey
 Cheaters at Play (1932) - Fenno Crozier
 The Greeks Had a Word for Them (1932) - Beautician (uncredited)
 Devil's Lottery (1932) - Joan Mather
 Hell's Headquarters (1932) - Diane Cameron
 By Whose Hand? (1932) - Alice
 The Night Mayor (1932) - Nutsy
 White Eagle (1932) - Janet Rand
 Deception (1932) - Joan Allen
 Forbidden Trail (1932) - Mary Middleton
 Sundown Rider (1932) - Molly McCall
 Olsen's Big Moment (1933) - Jane Van Allen
 State Trooper (1933) - Estelle
 Soldiers of the Storm (1933) - Spanish waitress
 Rusty Rides Alone (1933) - Mollie Martin
 My Weakness (1933) - Lois Crowley
 The Quitter (1934) - Diana Winthrop
 The Crosby Case (1934) - Nora
 School for Girls (1934) - Nell Davis
 Woman Unafraid (1934) - Mary Sloan
 Now I'll Tell (1934) - Wynne
 She Was a Lady (1934) - Moira
 When Strangers Meet (1934) - Elaine
 Pick a Star (1937) - Hostess (uncredited)
 Two-Fisted Sheriff (1937) - Molly Herrick
 One Man Justice (1937) - Mary Crockett
 The Old Wyoming Trail (1937) - Elsie Halliday
 Dramatic School (1938) - Student (uncredited)
 Paris Honeymoon (1939) - Julieska (uncredited)
 Dad Rudd, MP (1940) - Sybil Vane
 The Violent Years (1956) - Jane Parkins
 Gun Girls (1957) - Teddy's Mother (final film role)

References

External links

B-Western Heroines, Barbara Weeks

People from Somerville, Massachusetts
Actresses from Massachusetts
American film actresses
1913 births
2003 deaths
WAMPAS Baby Stars
20th-century American actresses
21st-century American women